František Kundra (born 2 May 1980 in Bardejov) is a retired Slovak football midfielder. His former club was Partizán Bardejov.

External links
 at partizanbj.sk

References

1980 births
Living people
Slovak footballers
Association football midfielders
KSZO Ostrowiec Świętokrzyski players
Ruch Chorzów players
ŠK Futura Humenné players
FC DAC 1904 Dunajská Streda players
Partizán Bardejov players
I liga players
II liga players
People from Bardejov
Sportspeople from the Prešov Region
Slovak expatriate footballers
Slovak expatriate sportspeople in Poland
Expatriate footballers in Poland